The Villa District, also known as Villa Historic District, is a historic district in Chicago, Illinois, United States. It is located on Chicago's Northwest Side within the community area of Irving Park. Its borders are along Pulaski Road to the west, the Union Pacific/Northwest rail line to the north, Hamlin Avenue to the east, and Addison Street to the south. Located directly north of the Wacławowo area of Avondale, the Villa District is serviced by the Blue Line's Addison street station.

The district was built in 1902 by a number of architects, many of them visibly influenced by Frank Lloyd Wright's Prairie Style of architecture. Most notable among these were bungalows designed by the architectural firm of Hatzfeld and Knox, whose partner Clarence Hatzfeld would later design the fieldhouse and natatorium at Portage Park. The area was originally developed as the "Villa addition to Irving Park" and showcases many unique Craftsman and Prairie style homes fronting on picturesque boulevard style streets. Although St. Wenceslaus church, a majestic Romanesque-Art Deco hybrid draws many of the tourists visiting the area, this historic church is actually a few blocks south of the district's formal boundaries.

The Villa district was the northwest "bookend" for Chicago's vaunted Polish Corridor along Milwaukee Avenue that extended from Division and Ashland Avenue at Polonia Triangle. Journalist Mike Royko famously dubbed the area as the Polish Kenilworth after the posh suburb of Chicago's North Shore.

The Villa Historic District was added to the National Register of Historic Places on September 11, 1979.  Its area was increased on March 10, 1983 by the addition of the Villa Apartments, 3948-3952 and 3949-3953 W. Waveland Ave.

The Villa District was designated a Chicago Landmark on November 23, 1983.

References

External links
 The Villa Improvement League

Historic districts in Chicago
North Side, Chicago
Neighborhoods in Chicago
Residential buildings on the National Register of Historic Places in Chicago
Houses completed in 1902
Polish-American culture in Chicago
Populated places established in 1902
Historic districts on the National Register of Historic Places in Illinois
Chicago Landmarks